The 1989 Portland Timbers season was the ninth season for a club bearing the Portland Timbers name. The club, previously known as F.C. Portland, changed its name to the Portland Timbers prior to the beginning of the 1989 Western Soccer League season.

Squad  
The 1989 squad

Western Soccer League

Regular season

North Division standings

League results 

Source:

Postseason

Playoff bracket 

Source:

Playoff results 

Source:

References

1989
American soccer clubs 1989 season
1989 in sports in Oregon
1989 in Portland, Oregon